Joseph Patrick Brennan (10 September 1889 – 4 May 1968) was an Irish Clann na Poblachta politician and medical doctor.

He was born in 1889 in Fitchburg, Massachusetts, U.S. He was the son of Patrick Brennan and Julia O'Connor who married in Boston in 1888. He moved back from the US to his mother's native Knocknagoshel, County Kerry at around the age of six years. His father had received communication from his brothers in Kalgoorlie, Western Australia regarding the Gold Rush and decided to join them in Australia and made his fortune with his brothers in the drapery business. The Brennan Building still stands today in Hannan Street, Kalgoorlie. On his father's return to Ireland in either 1908 or 1912 he brought an estate called Delbrook Park in Dublin.

He was educated at Blackrock College and Rockwell College. He qualified as a doctor in 1917. He married Anne Elizabeth Bulloch in Edinburgh, Scotland in 1914. He entered the British Army in 1917 as a Medical officer serving in Egypt and Turkey.

He returned to Ireland around 1918 and became a General practitioner in Blackrock, County Dublin. He also became Coroner for South County Dublin. Brennan was also involved in the Republican movement sometime in 1918. He was Head of Medical Services during the Irish Civil War. During the civil war, a group of insurgents that included Brennan had occupied part of the Gresham Hotel in O'Connell Street and were holding out against the Free State army. Their position became untenable and the group decided to surrender. The surrender was underway but Cathal Brugha refused to surrender himself came out brandishing a revolver and was shot by the Free State troops. Brennan attended his wounds but Brugha died two days later.

He was Vice President of the Irish Christian Front which held its inaugural meeting at the Mansion House, Dublin on 22 August 1936. The Irish Independent invited the formation of a committee to make a decision to support pro-Franco citizens of Spain in their war effort. Support was also given by the Catholic Church.

Brennan was a founding member of Clann na Poblachta. He was first elected to Dáil Éireann at the 1948 general election as a Clann na Poblachta Teachta Dála (TD) for the Dún Laoghaire and Rathdown constituency. He stood as a Labour Party candidate at the 1951 general election but was not re-elected. He also stood unsuccessfully as a Labour Party candidate at the 1954 general election.

He presided over the International Congress of Catholic Doctors which took place at University College Dublin in 1954. He was President of the Irish Bridge Union in 1955. He was elected as the first President of the Medico Legal Society of Ireland in 1956.

He is buried at Deans Grange Cemetery in Dublin.

References

External links
Kevin O'Connor 2006, The descendants of the O'Connors of Carrigafoyle stemming from the Datheenachs line O'Connor History Ltd, pages 60–67,110-115. . 978-0-9552990-0-1
Padraic O'Farrell. 1997, Who's Who in the Irish War of Independence and Civil War 1916-1923, The Lilliput Press, Dublin.
Obituary, Dr Joe Brennan. Journal of the Irish Medical Association, Volume 61. June 1968. No.372
The Medico-Legal Society of Ireland. History, Formation of the Society
Irish Bridge Union, Golden Jubilee 1955-2005.

1889 births
1968 deaths
Burials at Deans Grange Cemetery
Clann na Poblachta TDs
Labour Party (Ireland) politicians
Members of the 13th Dáil
Politicians from Fitchburg, Massachusetts
Politicians from County Dublin
People educated at Blackrock College
People educated at Rockwell College